The St. Malo Warriors are a junior "B" ice hockey team based in St. Malo, Manitoba. They are members of the Capital Region Junior Hockey League (CRJHL). The franchise was founded in 1963.

The Warriors have been a consistent competitive team but have only the 2009 league championships which qualified them to the Keystone Cup. Their second visit to the Keystone Cup was in 2013 when they hosted the tournament. In 2018 due to BC, Alta and Sask refusing to send teams to the Keystone Cup, the Warriors as playoff runner-up advanced with the champion Peguis Juniors in a Keystone Cup cross border match with the Lakehead Junior Hockey League champions and runner ups.

The team was a member of the Keystone Junior Hockey League until 2018.  For the 2018–19 season the Warriors were one of five teams that departed the Keystone Junior Hockey League and established the Capital Region Junior Hockey League.

Season-by-season records

Note: GP = Games played, W = Wins, L = Losses, T = Ties, OTL = Overtime Losses, Pts = Points, GF = Goals for, GA = Goals against,   PCT = Winning Percentage

Keystone Cup history
Western Canadian Jr. B Championships (Northern Ontario to British Columbia)Six teams in round-robin play. 1st vs. 2nd for gold/silver; 3rd vs. 4th for bronze.

Coaches
Ralph Collette 1994–present
Dan Zarazun 2004–2013
Mark Dixon 2012–2013

External links
Keystonejr.ca
Official Site

Ice hockey teams in Manitoba
Sport in Eastman Region, Manitoba